Dinamo-Yantar, formerly Dinamo (Moscow Oblast) or Dinamo (Moscow region) was a Russian women's volleyball club de jure based in Kaliningrad (de facto in Moscow), who played in the Super League, the top Russian league from 2003–04 until 2010–11.

Previous names
 Dinamo Moscow Oblast (2002–2006)
 Dinamo-Yantar Kaliningrad (2006–2011)

History
The team was part of the Dynamo Sports Club with players being provided by Uralochka which at the time had up to three teams competing in the Russian leagues and was the dominant Russian force in women's volleyball. Olga Fateeva was the first of these players, who came for the club's first season in 2002–03 at the second division. The club gained promotion by finishing second place in that season.

The club's second season of existence (2003–04), marked its debut in the Super League, the country's highest league. For that season, young but experienced players such as Irina Tebenikhina, Marina Sheshenina, Elena Sennikova, Yelena Plotnikova, Natalia Vdovina and Yekaterina Gamova came from the Uralochka teams. That made the club very competitive, finishing the Super League as runners-up.

The club had a disappointing season in 2004–05 when it finished sixth place. The following season (2005–06) results were better and the club finish third.

In 2006, following a proposition between the Volleyball Federation of Russia and the Government of Kaliningrad, it was decided to relocate the team to Kaliningrad under the name , but the club continued to play its home matches at Moscow's Dynamo Sports Palace in the 2006–07, 2007–08, 2008–09, 2009–10 seasons. During that time the club's results were also not enough to compete for the titles, with the best finish coming as a 6th place in the 2006–07 season. By the time the club folded in May 2011, after a 12th place finish in the 2010–11 season, it had played a total of two matches in Kaliningrad (both in the 2007–08 season).

The club also participated in European competitions without success. It played the CEV Cup (now called CEV Challenge Cup) twice (in 2004–05 and 2006–07) and the Top Teams Cup (now called CEV Cup) twice (in 2004–05 and 2005–06).

Team squad
This was the club's last squad, from season 2010–2011.

References

External links
VC Dynamo-Yantar Kaliningrad official website 
Club profile at ВФВ (Volleyball Federation of Russia) 

Kaliningrad
Sport in Kaliningrad
Russian volleyball clubs
Volleyball clubs established in 2002
2002 establishments in Russia
Defunct sports teams in Russia